The Algerian League Cup is an Algerian football competition organized by the Algerian Football Federation. The competition was launched in the first edition in 1992 and was not regular and after that three copies were held before it stopped, It was contested by the clubs of L1 and L2. Twenty years after it came back again due to the cancellation of the Algerian Cup, this time with the participation of Ligue Professionnelle 1 clubs only.

Winners

Winners by club

External links
 Different Algerian Cups - rsssf.com

References

 
Lea
Recurring sporting events established in 1992
1992 establishments in Algeria
National association football league cups
Recurring sporting events disestablished in 2000
2000 disestablishments in Africa